The Cache Creek Terrane (alternately known as Cache Creek Melange ) is a geologic terrane in British Columbia and southern Yukon, Canada.

The Cache Creek Terrane consists of Carboniferous to Lower Jurassic volcanic rocks, carbonate rocks, coarse clastic rocks and small amounts of ultramafic rock, chert and argillite.

Three geological formations comprise the Cache Creek Terrane: the Sitlika Assemblage, the Tezzeron succession and the Cache Creek Complex.

This terrane is mentioned in the video Where terranes collide (done in conjunction with Canada's geologic survey).

See also

References

External links
Research Papers
The Odyssey of the Cache Creek Terrane
Mineral Resources Map
Significance of Jurassic Radiolarians from the Cache Creek Terrane
Northern Cordilleran terranes and their interactions through time
Books, Periodicals

Cache Creek Terrane (book chapter)

Terranes
Geology of British Columbia
Geology of Yukon
Carboniferous British Columbia
Carboniferous Yukon
Jurassic British Columbia
Jurassic Yukon